Epsom Downs is a Grade 1 racecourse on the hills associated with Epsom in Surrey, England which is used for thoroughbred horse racing. The "Downs" referred to in the name are part of the North Downs.

The course, which has a crowd capacity of 130,000 when taking into account people watching from the Epsom Downs, an area freely available to the public, is best known for hosting the Derby Stakes, which has come to be widely referred to as The Derby or as the Cazoo Derby for sponsorship reasons, the United Kingdom's premier thoroughbred horse race for three-year-old colts and fillies, over a mile and a half (2400 m). It also hosts the Oaks Stakes (also widely referred to as The Oaks) for three-year-old fillies, and the Coronation Cup for horses aged four years and upwards. All three races are Group 1 races and run over the same course and distance.

The Chairman of the course since 2015 is Julia Budd. The course is owned by the Jockey Club.  The Queen has attended the Derby most years.

History
The first recorded race was held on the Downs in 1661, although a local burial list of 1625 refers to "William Stanley who in running the race fell from his horse and brake his neck" and in some sources racing is recorded as dating from the 1640s, so it is likely that racing was established much earlier than that.  Epsom is referenced in the diary of Samuel Pepys in 1663 and Charles II is said to have been a racegoer there.  By 1684, Epsom had a clerk of the course and from 1730 was hosting twice yearly race meetings.

At Epsom on 3 May 1769 the famous racehorse Eclipse had the first of his many victories in an undefeated career on the turf.

In the summer of 1779 Edward Smith-Stanley, 12th Earl of Derby, organised a race for himself and his friends to race their three-year-old fillies. He named it the Oaks after his nearby estate. The race became so successful that in the following year 1780 a new race was added for three-year-old colts and fillies—-the Derby. In 1784 the course was extended to its current distance of a mile and a half and Tattenham Corner was introduced.

Henry Dorling, step-father to cookery writer Mrs Beeton, was a Clerk of the Course at Epsom, appointed in 1840.

In 1913 the suffragette Emily Davison threw herself in front of King George V's horse Anmer, bringing him down. Davison was badly injured and died four days later.

In 1952 the racecourse was featured extensively in the film Derby Day set around the 1952 Epsom Derby.

In 2009 the racecourse opened the new Duchess's Stand. It has a capacity of 11,000 and has a 960 m² (10 000 sq ft) hall. It can be used for banqueting, conferences and exhibitions. The estimated cost of the new stand, which was built by Willmott Dixon, was £23.5 million.

On 4 June 2011, in their first public outing since returning from their Seychelles honeymoon, Prince William, Duke of Cambridge, and his wife, Catherine, Duchess of Cambridge (along with the Queen, William's brother, Prince Harry, and Catherine's parents, Michael and Carole Middleton) attended the 2011 Epsom Derby at the track.

In 2022 the main stand of the racecourse, previously been known as The Queen’s Stand, was renamed the Queen Elizabeth II Stand.

Description

The racecourse is between Epsom, Tadworth and Langley Vale. As it is in a public area, people can watch the Derby free, and this meant that the Derby used to be the most attended sporting event of the year. It presents a stern challenge for inexperienced horses and a true test of stamina for those that might previously have contested the 2,000 Guineas Stakes over a mile (1600 m). Unusually, the racecourse is not a circuit but is roughly "U"-shaped with chutes for the start of sprint races over five, six and seven furlongs. The Derby course features an ascent to the top of the hill followed by a wide, sweeping left turn (Tattenham Corner) as the horses descend towards the straight. The half-mile straight is mainly downhill, with a final sharp ascent in the last hundred yards. The predominantly downhill nature of the straight means that times for the sprint races tend to be much faster than those on flatter tracks. Clockings for the five-furlong course have included 53.6 s (hand-timed) by Indigenous in 1960 and 53.70 s (electrically-timed) by Spark Chief in 1983.

Epsom Downs houses the third largest racehorse training facility in the country. The facility is managed by the Epsom trainers society. There are 11 trainers who use the facility, including Simon Dow and Laura Mongan (the only female trainer at Epsom).

The area is served by the Epsom Downs railway line as well as Tattenham Corner railway station, which is where the Queen alights from the British Royal Train on race days.

Notable races 

Other races
 Epsom Dash

Gallery

References

Bibliography

External links 
Official site
Course guide on GG.COM
Course guide on At The Races

 
Epsom and Ewell
Horse racing venues in England
Sports venues in Surrey
Sports venues completed in 1661
1661 establishments in England